The Original Pancake House (TOPH) is a chain of pancake houses across the United States. They have franchises in Canada that started in 1958 and are still operating.  They have recently expanded into both Japan and South Korea. They follow traditional recipes and ingredients for their pancakes but offer other standard diner fare as well. They also have a spin-off, Walker Brothers Pancake House, which has a similar menu, but with a formal ambiance.

History

The first Original Pancake House opened in 1953 in Portland, Oregon, by Les Highet and Erma Hueneke, who collected recipes for their restaurant from around the world. They soon franchised the name and recipes into locations spanning more than half of the U.S. states and Winnipeg, Manitoba

Known for their breakfast foods; their signature dishes are the Apple Pancake, Dutch Baby, German Pancake, and omelets. They have over 100 franchised locations throughout the United States, and are located from Seattle to Edgewater, from Wilmette to Williamsville, from Honolulu to its headquarters in Portland. One of the earliest franchised restaurants opened in Anaheim, California in 1958 and is currently owned by family of employees of the original Portland location.

In 1999, the Original Pancake House in Portland received a James Beard Foundation Award as an American Classic.  OPH was also named one of USA Today's Top 10 Pancake Restaurants in the Nation according to the company website, and the Hyde Park, Chicago location was well known as Chicago Mayor Richard M. Daley's favorite breakfast eatery. On one occasion, he conducted an interview in the restaurant with anchorman Walter Jacobson.

The chain, which moved to Canada in 1959, spread further internationally in May 2013, when it opened its first overseas location in Seoul, South Korea. A month later, it expanded to Kichijōji, Tokyo in Japan.

Locations
The Original Pancake House is located in 28 states, with stores in most of the major metropolitan cities including Austin, Atlanta, Dallas, Miami, Chicago, Seattle, Denver, and Charlotte. A complete list of locations can be found on the website.

The Winnipeg franchisee at one point had only one restaurant but has recently expanded to run four restaurants in the Canadian city under the same name with a similar logo while continuing to feature some of the chain's specialities such as the Dutch baby pancake and Giant Apple Pancakes.

See also
 Golden Nugget Pancake House
 IHOP
 The Royal Canadian Pancake Houses
 List of pancake houses
 Waffle House

References

External links

Regional restaurant chains in the United States
Pancake houses
Restaurant franchises
1953 establishments in Oregon
Restaurants in Portland, Oregon
James Beard Foundation Award winners
Restaurants established in 1953